The men and women's world allround speed skating championships were held for the last time separately in 1995. The events were:
1995 Men's World Allround Speed Skating Championships
1995 Women's World Allround Speed Skating Championships